Brandon Township may refer to the following places in the United States:

 Brandon Township, Jackson County, Iowa
 Brandon Township, Michigan
 Brandon Township, Minnesota
 Brandon Township, Minnehaha County, South Dakota